The S.A. Kimbrough House is a historic house at 302 East Illinois Street in Beebe, Arkansas.  It is a single story wood-frame structure, with a T-shaped layout, cross-gable roof, weatherboard siding, and a brick pier foundation.  It has two porches, each with delicate turned posts and balusters, and a bracketed hood over a pair of sash windows in the front-facing gable.  Built about 1870, the house is one of White County's oldest surviving houses.

The house was listed on the National Register of Historic Places in 1991.

See also
National Register of Historic Places listings in White County, Arkansas

References

Houses on the National Register of Historic Places in Arkansas
Houses in White County, Arkansas
National Register of Historic Places in White County, Arkansas
Buildings and structures in Beebe, Arkansas